Vibratex is a manufacturer of sex toys, headquartered in Napa, California. Founded in the early 1980s, Vibratex has since been covered by Glamour magazine and O, The Oprah Magazine.

Vibratex produces the Rabbit Pearl vibrator, which is the rabbit vibrator featured on Season 1, Episode 9 of HBO's hit series Sex and the City.

Since 2000, Vibratex has been the only authorized U.S. import agent of the Hitachi Magic Wand massager, sold as Magic Wand Original.

References 

Sex toy manufacturers